Apphia Yu, also known as Ayu Sakata, is an American voice actress. She has worked on games such as Loren The Amazon Princess and Tales of Aravorn: Seasons of the Wolf, and on anime like Assassination Classroom. She is the founder of sakevisual, a company based in Dallas, Texas that makes original visual novel games. She is married to voice actor Micah Solusod.

Filmography

Anime series

Animated series
 RWBY (2016), Young Lie Ren
 Heaven Official's Blessing (2021), Xiao Ying

Film

Video games

Production credits

ADR directing

References

External links
 
 

Living people
American video game actresses
American voice actresses
American voice directors
21st-century American women
Year of birth missing (living people)